A photoresistor (also known as a photocell, or light-dependent resistor, LDR, or photo-conductive cell) is a passive component that decreases resistance with respect to receiving luminosity (light) on the component's sensitive surface. The resistance of a photoresistor decreases with increase in incident light intensity; in other words, it exhibits photoconductivity. A photoresistor can be applied in light-sensitive detector circuits and light-activated and dark-activated switching circuits acting as a resistance semiconductor. In the dark, a photoresistor can have a resistance as high as several megaohms (MΩ), while in the light, a photoresistor can have a resistance as low as a few hundred ohms. If incident light on a photoresistor exceeds a certain frequency, photons absorbed by the semiconductor give bound electrons enough energy to jump into the conduction band. The resulting free electrons (and their hole partners) conduct electricity, thereby lowering resistance. The resistance range and sensitivity of a photoresistor can substantially differ among dissimilar devices. Moreover, unique photoresistors may react substantially differently to photons within certain wavelength bands.

A photoelectric device can be either intrinsic or extrinsic. An intrinsic semiconductor has its own charge carriers and is not an efficient semiconductor, for example, silicon. In intrinsic devices, most of the available electrons are in the valence band, and hence the photon must have enough energy to excite the electron across the entire bandgap. Extrinsic devices have impurities, also called dopants, added whose ground state energy is closer to the conduction band; since the electrons do not have as far to jump, lower energy photons (that is, longer wavelengths and lower frequencies) are sufficient to trigger the device. If a sample of silicon has some of its atoms replaced by phosphorus atoms (impurities), there will be extra electrons available for conduction. This is an example of an extrinsic semiconductor.

Design considerations

A photoresistor is less light-sensitive than a photodiode or a phototransistor.  The latter two components are true semiconductor devices, while a photoresistor is a passive component that does not have a PN-junction.  The photoresistivity of any photoresistor may vary widely depending on ambient temperature, making them unsuitable for applications requiring precise measurement of or sensitivity to light photons.

Photoresistors also exhibit a certain degree of latency between exposure to light and the subsequent decrease in resistance, usually around 10 milliseconds. The lag time when going from lit to dark environments is even greater, often as long as one second. This property makes them unsuitable for sensing rapidly flashing lights, but is sometimes used to smooth the response of audio signal compression.

Applications

Photoresistors come in many types. Inexpensive cadmium sulfide (CdS) cells can be found in many consumer items such as camera light meters, clock radios, alarm devices (as the detector for a light beam), nightlights, outdoor clocks, solar street lamps, and solar road studs, etc.

Photoresistors can be placed in streetlights to control when the light is on. Ambient light falling on the photoresistor causes the streetlight to turn off. Thus energy is saved by ensuring the light is only on during hours of darkness.

Photoresistors or LDRs are also used in laser-based security systems to detect the change in the light intensity when a person/object passes through the laser beam. 

They are also used in some dynamic compressors together with a small incandescent or neon lamp, or light-emitting diode to control gain reduction. A common usage of this application can be found in many guitar amplifiers that incorporate an onboard tremolo effect, as the oscillating light patterns control the level of signal running through the amplifier circuit.

The use of CdS and CdSe photoresistors is severely restricted in Europe due to the RoHS ban on cadmium.

Lead sulfide (PbS) and indium antimonide (InSb) LDRs (light-dependent resistors) are used for the mid-infrared spectral region. Ge:Cu photoconductors are among the best far-infrared detectors available, and are used for infrared astronomy and infrared spectroscopy.

See also
Optoelectronics
Photodetector

References

External links

 Using a photoresistor to track light
 Connecting a photoresistor to a circuit
 Photoresistor overview - detailing operation, structure and circuit information

Resistive components
Optical devices
Sensors